Paracas National Reserve is a protected area located in the region of Ica, Peru and protects desert and marine ecosystems for their conservation and sustainable use. There are also archaeological remains of the Paracas culture inside the reserve.

Geography 
The reserve is located in the region of Ica, 250 km south of Lima, and a few kilometers from the town of Pisco.
It spans an area of 335,000 hectares, 65% of which correspond to marine ecosystems. The highest elevation in the reserve is 786 m.

The reserve includes coastal geographic features such as: the Paracas Peninsula, Independencia Bay, San Gallán Island, Paracas Bay and Independencia Island.

Climate 

Paracas National Reserve is an arid zone, with intense local winds known as paracas. Precipitation is scarce and occurs in winter, falling mostly on the top of the highest hills, which is vital to the lomas ecosystem. The following climograph corresponds to the nearby town of Pisco (19 m of elevation).

Ecology

Flora 
Some terrestrial plant species found in the reserve are: Tiquilia paronychoides, Prosopis pallida, Distichlis spicata, Tillandsia spp., Eriosyce omasensis, Geoffroea decorticans, Sesuvium portulacastrum, Cressa truxillensis, Geranium limae, Suaeda foliosa, Oxalis carnosa, etc.

Marine algae found in the reserve include: Ulva lactuca, Chondracanthus chamissoi, Macrocystis pyrifera, Pyropia columbina, etc.

Fauna 
Mammals found in the reserve include: the sei whale, the South American fur seal, the dusky dolphin, the marine otter, the sperm whale, the humpback whale, the South American sea lion, the killer whale, the common bottlenose dolphin, the southern right whale, etc.

Birds found in the reserve include: the Andean condor, the Chilean flamingo, the spotted sandpiper, the oasis hummingbird, the Peruvian pelican, the Inca tern, the black skimmer, the Humboldt penguin, the guanay cormorant, the Peruvian thick-knee, the Andean swift, the Peruvian diving petrel, etc.

Molluscs found in the area include: Argopecten purpuratus, Concholepas concholepas, Thais chocolata, Fissurella maxima, Glaucus atlanticus, Choromytilus chorus, Aulacomya atra, etc.

Fish found in the reserve include: the Peruvian hake, the flathead grey mullet, the skipjack tuna, the blue flyingfish, the humpback smooth-hound, the copper shark, the Peruvian anchoveta, the eastern Pacific bonito, the Peruvian eagle ray, the fine flounder, the blue shark, the corvina, the bigeye tuna, etc.

Archaeology 
There are more than 100 archaeological sites identified inside the reserve, many of them of the Paracas culture, known especially for their textile crafts.

Recreation 
Beach tourism and wildlife observation are the main activities in the reserve.

See also
Humboldt current

References

External links
 Paracas National Reserve. Official site (in Spanish)

Protected areas established in 1975
World Heritage Sites in Peru
Ramsar sites in Peru
Geography of Ica Region
Tourist attractions in Ica Region
Rock formations of Peru